The Choanephoraceae are a family of fungi in the order Mucorales. Members of this family are found mostly in the tropics or subtropics, and only rarely in temperate zones. The family currently includes species formerly classified in the family Gilbertellaceae.

Description
In this family, the sporangia and sporangiola borne on separate and distinct sporangiophores. Zygospores are striate, and borne on apposed or tongue-like suspensors.

References

External links
 
 

Zygomycota
Taxa named by Joseph Schröter
Taxa described in 1894
Fungus families